A constitutional plebiscite held in the Philippines on 14 May 1935 ratified the 1935 Philippine Constitution which established the Philippine Commonwealth. The constitution had been written in 1934 by the Constitutional Convention of 1934.

The Tydings–McDuffie Act of the United States Government detailed the steps required for the Philippines to become independent of the United States.  A previous act, the Hare–Hawes–Cutting Act, had been rejected by the Philippine Congress.

The constitution was approved by 96% of voters, and was replaced by the 1973 Constitution of the Philippines.

Question

Results

Results by province

See also
 1934 Philippine Constitutional Convention election

References

1935 referendums
1935 in the Philippines
Constitutional referendums in the Philippines
Presidency of Manuel L. Quezon